The Kalapuya are a Native American ethnic group native to what is now Oregon. Kalapuya may refer to:

Kalapuya language, their language
Kalapuya (fungus) – a genus of truffle-like fungi
the Treaty with the Kalapuya, etc. is also known as the Kalapuya Treaty